Moses Jacob Storm (born May 6, 1990 in Kalamazoo, Michigan, United States) is an American writer, actor, comedian, and performance artist who has appeared in film, television and radio.

Early life
Moses Storm was born in Kalamazoo, Michigan, as one of five children of missionary parents. Storm and his siblings were raised by their religious parents on a converted Greyhound bus after he reached the age of two. According to Storm, his family particiapted in a non-denominational religious sect know as "The Way", which was led by his uncle. Storm was mostly homeschooled by his mother. The family would travel from town to town, preaching at state fairs and music festivals.  From a young age, he watched Conan O'Brien by recording the episodes over Christian learning video tapes.

Storm attended one semester of community college for video production but diverged from the course. Upon recognising his skill as a performer, he moved to Los Angeles and took a cleaning job. He claims that he then became a comedian when he realised he was "good at nothing else."

Career

Comedy
Storm is an alumnus of the UCB Theatre and currently hosts a live program called Trifecta alongside Ify Nwadiwe and Christian Spicer at the UCB Theatre Sunset venue. Previously, he co-hosted & produced a bi-monthly show on the Nerdist stage at Meltdown Comics called This Show is Your Show!, which LA Weekly listed in their "Best Of" section as "Best Comedy Show".

Storm has performed stand-up on Last Comic Standing and Conan.  Storm accompanied Conan O'Brien, as well as Ron Funches, Laurie Kilmartin, and Flula Borg, on select dates for O'Brien's limited "Conan & Friends: An Evening of Stand-Up and Investment Tips" tour in late 2018. Storm has also performed alongside Jo Firestone at the Toronto Comedy Festival for SiriusXM's JFL42 program.  In 2018, Storm performed a show at The Kennedy Center. He also performed at the 2018 SF Sketchfest in shows with Fred Armisen and Jacqueline Novak.  On January 20, 2022, Storm debuted in his own comedy special on HBO Max, Trash White, produced by Conan O'Brien.

Storm recited a monologue for The Moth titled "It Pays to Be Poor". For this performance, Storm was awarded the title of The MothGrandSlam Champion.

Acting
As an actor, Storm has portrayed many characters in different projects on television, including The 4 to 9ers, Another Period, Youth and Consequences, About a Boy, This is Us, and Arrested Development. He also appeared in the Comedy Central Originals one-off special Ice To Iceland. In 2019, Storm starred as one of the leads in NBC sitcom Sunnyside.  The series was canceled after four episodes.

In film, Storm received critical acclaim for his role as Mitch Roussel in the 2014 horror film Unfriended.

Storm also appeared in a commercial for Burger King.

Performance Art
In 2014, Storm put on The Modern Millennial, an immersive theater performance piece that was funded on Kickstarter. The crowdfunding paid for a loft space in Los Angeles where Storm resided for 24/7, and audiences could go to watch him  live his day to day life.  The space also included art exhibits by Storm.

Filmography

Film

Television

References

External links
 Official website Associate Website
 

1990 births
21st-century American comedians
21st-century American male actors
American male comedians
American male film actors
American male television actors
American sketch comedians
American television writers
Living people
Male actors from Michigan
American male television writers
People from Kalamazoo, Michigan
21st-century American screenwriters
21st-century American male writers